Chenkalady or Chenkaladi is a town in the Batticaloa District of Sri Lanka, it is located about 15 km north-west of Batticaloa. In Tamil it translates to "By-the-brick".

References 

Towns in Batticaloa District
Eravurpattu DS Division